Paul Marque (born April 12, 1997) is a French ballet dancer . In December 2020, he was named an étoile (literally, "star"), the highest rank of the Paris Opera Ballet.

Biography 
Paul Marque was born in Dax, Landes and began dancing at the age of four with jazz dance at the studio, "On Stage" in Dax, directed by Laetitia Michel. Born to a father who is a radiologist and a mother who was a radiologist in the army, he is one of four children. At the age of seven, he discovered ballet when he began attending Nicole Cavallin's school of dance in Biarritz.

In January 2008, at the age of ten, he entered the Paris Opera Ballet School before graduating to the Paris Opera Ballet. He was promoted to the rank of coryphée, the second of five ranks within the Paris Opera Ballet, in 2016. He won the gold medal at the Varna International Ballet Competition in 2016.

In 2017, Marque was promoted to the rank of sujet. He also won the Prix de l'Association pour le rayonnement de l'Opéra national de Paris, which is an annual prize from the non-profit group that promotes the works and dancers of the Paris Opera Ballet. Marque was again promoted in 2018 to the rank of premier danseur, the second highest rank within the Paris Opera Ballet.

On December 13, 2020, at 23 years old, Marque was promoted to the highest rank of étoile, literally "star", of the Paris Opera Ballet, based upon the recommendation of Aurélie Dupont, dance director of the Paris Opera. The announcement was made following a performance of Rudolf Nureyev's production of La Bayadère. In that performance, Marque danced in the role of the Golden Idol, which is a secondary role in that ballet. The Paris Opera was closed to the public due to the COVID-19 pandemic, so that show was performed without a live audience, but was watched by 10,000 spectators in an online broadcast on the streaming platform L’Opéra chez soi, which was launched a few days prior.

Répertoire 
After starting with the Paris Opera Ballet, Marque has danced in a number of productions, notably, Cinderella, Swan Lake, Giselle, La Sylphide, The Nutcracker, Don Quixote, and La Bayadère. Other works he has danced in include Blake Works I by William Forsythe in 2016, Undoing World by Bruno Bouché in 2017, and Dogs Sleep by Marco Goecke in 2019.

Marque has also danced in A Midsummer Night's Dream by George Balanchine in 2017, and in two choreographies of Jerome Robbins: The Goldberg Variations in 2016 and Fancy Free in 2018.

References

External links 
Paul Marque on the website of the Paris Opera ballet
Meeting with Paul Marque, new danseur étoile of the Paris Opera, France 2, December 19, 2020

1997 births
21st-century French ballet dancers
Living people
People from Dax, Landes
French male ballet dancers
Paris Opera Ballet étoiles